Nicola Dickson "Niki" Sauvage Tsongas (born April 26, 1946) is an American politician who served as a U.S. Representative from Massachusetts from 2007 to 2019. She is a member of the Democratic Party. In August 2017 Tsongas announced that she would not seek another term in the November 2018 election.

Early life and education
Tsongas was born Nicola Dickson Sauvage on April 26, 1946, in Chico, California. Her mother, Marian Susan (née Wyman), was an artist and copywriter, and her father, Colonel Russell Elmer Sauvage, was an engineer in the United States Army Air Forces who survived the attack on Pearl Harbor. Tsongas graduated in 1964 from Narimasu American High School in Japan while her father was stationed at Fuchu Air Force Base. She spent one year at Michigan State University, then transferred to Smith College in Northampton, Massachusetts, graduating in 1968 with a Bachelor of Arts in religion. After college she moved to New York City, where she took a job as a social worker for the Department of Welfare. Tsongas earned her Juris Doctor from Boston University and started Lowell's first all-female law practice.

Early career 
Tsongas interned in Arlington, Virginia, for presidential candidate Eugene McCarthy during summer 1967; at a party there she met Paul Tsongas, then an aide to Republican Congressman Brad Morse. In 1969, she married Paul; they had three daughters: Ashley, Katina, and Molly. After being diagnosed with non-Hodgkin lymphoma, he declined to seek a second term in the Senate; he resigned the day before his term expired. The Tsongases moved from Washington, D.C., back to Massachusetts for Paul to undergo treatments. After seemingly being cured of his disease, in 1992 Paul ran for the Democratic nomination for president; he came in third behind former California Governor Jerry Brown and eventual winner Bill Clinton. Paul's cancer later returned; he died of pneumonia and liver failure on January 18, 1997.

Before her election to the House, Tsongas worked as the dean of external affairs at Middlesex Community College, as a board member of Fallon Health and on the Lowell Civic Stadium and Arena Commission, which oversees several sites, including the Tsongas Arena. In 2001, Representative Marty Meehan appointed Tsongas to head a foundation to provide education funding for children of the victims of the September 11 attacks.

U.S. House of Representatives

Elections
After Marty Meehan resigned in 2007 to serve as chancellor of the University of Massachusetts Lowell, Tsongas ran in the special election. She defeated four other candidates to win the Democratic primary with 36% of the vote. During her initial campaign Tsongas received endorsements from The Boston Globe, the Boston Herald, and the Lowell Sun. During the general election, former President Bill Clinton, who defeated her husband for the Democratic nomination in 1992, campaigned for her. At an event in Lowell Massachusetts, Clinton remarked: "Congress will be a better place because she is there." Tsongas won the special election against Republican Jim Ogonowski with 51% of the vote on October 17; she became the only female representative from Massachusetts, and the first from that state since the 1983 retirement of Margaret Heckler, who became Secretary of Health and Human Services under Ronald Reagan.

After running unopposed in 2008, in 2010 Tsongas faced Republican Jon Golnik, a small businessman and former Wall Street currency trader. During the campaign Tsongas attacked Golnik's history as a Vice President of AIG, which Golnik called hypocritical as she owned stock in AIG and other large corporations. Tsongas defeated Golnik with 52% of the vote. Following redistricting after the 2010 census, Tsongas ran for reelection in the reconfigured  in 2012. In a rematch, she again defeated Golnik.

Tenure

A major issue in her initial election was whether the two candidates would vote to override President George W. Bush's veto of an expansion of the State Children's Health Insurance Program. Tsongas said she would, and it was reported that Ogonowski would not. Hours after being sworn into office on October 18, Tsongas voted to override, but the vote failed to achieve the necessary two-thirds majority.

As a candidate in 2007, Tsongas promised to withdraw troops and end the Iraq War. The first bill she introduced aimed to do this by implementing a timetable for withdrawal from Iraq; the bill died in committee. In 2010, along with other women in Congress, including House Speaker Nancy Pelosi, Tsongas visited Afghanistan to oversee the war effort. Upon returning, she spoke of the need for the involvement of women in rebuilding of government.

Tsongas is an advocate for universal health care and supports a public health insurance option. In 2010 she voted for the Patient Protection and Affordable Care Act and Health Care and Education Reconciliation Act. In 2012 Tsongas joined a Republican-led effort to repeal a 2.3% sales tax on medical-device manufacturers, which passed the House 270–146; 36 other Democrats voted for it. Tsongas is pro-choice and received a 100% approval rating from Planned Parenthood in 2008. A supporter of LGBT rights, she cosponsored the Respect for Marriage Act to repeal the Defense of Marriage Act; and voted for the Don't Ask, Don't Tell Repeal Act of 2010, which allows gays and lesbians to serve openly in the United States Armed Forces.

In the 2012 Massachusetts Senate election Tsongas was the first major Democratic politician to endorse Elizabeth Warren, whom she called "a fighter for middle-class families". After President Barack Obama appointed John Kerry as United States Secretary of State, there was much speculation that Tsongas would run in the special election for his seat, which her husband had also previously held. She briefly considered a run, but decided she would best be able to serve the people of Massachusetts by staying in the House, and endorsed fellow Representative Ed Markey.

In January 2013 Tsongas introduced the Nashua River Wild and Scenic River Study Act (H.R. 412; 113th Congress), a bill that would amend the Wild and Scenic Rivers Act to designate certain segments of the Nashua River in Massachusetts for study for potential addition to the National Wild and Scenic Rivers System. Tsongas discussed the river's history and past pollution problems in her testimony about the bill. She argued that the study would allow stakeholders to work together to "ensure that it remains a great place for canoeing, fishing, and enjoying the outdoors."

Tsongas was a member of the Congressional Arts Caucus and the U.S.-Japan Caucus.

Legacy
Opened in 2022, the 87-foot Niki Tsongas bridge in Lowell was named after her.

See also
 Women in the United States House of Representatives

References

External links

 

|-

|-

1946 births
21st-century American politicians
21st-century American women politicians
American people of French descent
American social workers
American women lawyers
Boston University School of Law alumni
Democratic Party members of the United States House of Representatives from Massachusetts
Female members of the United States House of Representatives
Living people
People from Chico, California
Politicians from Lowell, Massachusetts
Smith College alumni
Spouses of Massachusetts politicians
Women in Massachusetts politics